Dennis Geert Bernardus Johan Dieks (born 1 June 1949, in Amsterdam)  is a Dutch physicist and philosopher of physics.

Work
In 1982 he proved the no-cloning theorem (independently discovered in the same year by William Wootters and Wojciech H. Zurek). In 1989 he proposed a new interpretation of quantum mechanics, later known as a version of the modal interpretation of quantum mechanics. He also worked on the philosophy of space and time, the logic of probabilistic reasoning, and the theory of explanation. Dieks is a professor at Utrecht University and a member of the Royal Netherlands Academy of Arts and Sciences since 2008. He is co-editor of the journal Studies in History and Philosophy of Modern Physics, an editor of the journal Foundations of Physics (Editor-in-chief C. Rovelli) and co-editor of the book series European Studies in Philosophy of Science (Springer).

Dieks was also an able chess player, reaching a maximum Elo rating of 2290 in 1974 and even beating Jan Timman in a game played in 1977.

References

External links
 Modal Interpretations of Quantum Mechanics
 Studies in the History and Philosophy of Modern Physics, Elsevier
 Foundations of Physics, Springer
 European Studies in Philosophy of Science, Springer

1949 births
Living people
20th-century Dutch physicists
20th-century Dutch philosophers
Members of the Royal Netherlands Academy of Arts and Sciences
Scientists from Amsterdam
University of Amsterdam alumni
Utrecht University alumni
Academic staff of Utrecht University
21st-century Dutch physicists